Leucadendron album is a species of  flowering plant in the family Proteaceae that grows in South Africa.

Gallery

References and further reading

Coombes, A.J. 1992. Guide to plant names. Reed International Books, London.
Germishuizen, G. & Meyer, N.L. (eds). 2003. Plants of southern Africa : an annotated checklist. Strelitzia 14. National Botanical Institute, Pretoria.
Rebelo, A. (Tony). 1995. Proteas. A field guide to the proteas of southern Africa. edn 2. Fernwood Press, Vlaeberg, Cape Town.
Rousseau, F. 1970. The Proteaceae of South Africa. Purnell, Cape Town.
Stearn, W.T. 1966. Botanical Latin. edn 4. Timber Press, Portland. Oregon. USA.
 Stearn, W.T. 1992. Stearn's dictionary of plant names for gardeners. Timber Press, Portland. Oregon. USA.

album
Endemic flora of South Africa
Trees of South Africa